Greben (meaning "ridge" in Slavic languages) can refer to the following toponyms:

Greben (Višegrad), village in Bosnia and Herzegovina
Greben (mountain), mountain in Serbia and Bulgaria
Greben Hill, mountain in the Antarctica
Veliki Greben, mountain in northeastern Serbia
Greben' Island, minor island in Antarctica
Greben Island, minor island in Severnaya Zemlya Islands in the Russian Arctic